Koshka Yavr is a Soviet Naval Aviation and Russian Naval Aviation reserve airfield in Murmansk Oblast, Russia located 25 km southeast of Zapolyarny and 83 km west of Murmansk.  It was one of nine primary Arctic staging bases for the Tupolev Tu-22M (Backfire) bomber that was in service in the 1980s.

References

External links
RussianAirFields.com

Soviet Naval Aviation bases
Buildings and structures in Murmansk Oblast